Lenzi is an Italian surname. Notable people with the surname include:

 Andrea Lenzi (born 1988), Italian coxswain
 Aurelio Lenzi (1891–1967), Italian track and field athlete
 Damiano Lenzi (born 1987), Italian ski mountaineer and cross-country skier, Italian Army member
 Eugene J. Lenzi,  former American racing driver
 Giovanni Battista Lenzi (1951–2009), Italian politician
 Lio Lenzi (1898–1960), Italian politician and mayor
 Mark Lenzi (1968–2012), American Olympic diver and diving coach
 Michele Lenzi (1834–1886), Italian painter
 Umberto Lenzi (1931–2017), Italian film director, screenwriter and novelist

Italian-language surnames